Daniel Boone (1734–1820) was an American pioneer and hunter whose frontier exploits made him one of the first folk heroes of the United States.

Daniel Boone or Dan Boone may also refer to:

People 
Daniel Morgan Boone (1769–1839), son of Daniel Boone, American pioneer, explorer, and frontiersman important in the history of Missouri
Daniel Boone (MP), British Member of Parliament for Grampound, Ludgershall, Minehead and Stockbridge in 1741
Dan Boone (baseball) (1895–1968), Major League Baseball pitcher
Daniel Boone (singer) (born 1942), English pop musician
Danny Boone (born 1954), Major League Baseball pitcher
Dany Boon (born 1966), French comedian and filmmaker
Dan Boone (minister) (fl. 2000s), Nazarene minister, author, and university president

Film and television
Daniel Boone (1907 film), a film by Edwin S. Porter
In the Days of Daniel Boone or Daniel Boone, a 1923 film by William James Craft
Daniel Boone (1936 film), an American film by David Howard starring George O'Brien
Daniel Boone, Trail Blazer, a 1956 film starring Bruce Bennett 
Daniel Boone (1960 TV series), an ABC television miniseries that aired on Walt Disney Presents
Daniel Boone (1964 TV series), an NBC television series starring Fess Parker
Daniel Boone: Frontier Trail Rider, a 1966 film by George Sherman

Military
USS Daniel Boone (SSBN-629), a U.S. Navy ballistic missile submarine
Operation Daniel Boone, a military operation during the Vietnam war

Schools
Daniel Boone Area High School, Pennsylvania
Daniel Boone High School (Tennessee)

Other uses 
Daniel Boone (book), a 1940 book by James Daugherty
Daniel Boone, Kentucky
Daniel Boone Hotel (Boone, North Carolina)
Daniel Boone Hotel (Charleston, West Virginia)

See also
Boone (disambiguation)
Davy Crockett (1786–1836), American frontiersman sometimes confused with Daniel Boone
Daniel Boone Arboretum, Tennessee
Daniel Boone Bridge, spanning the Missouri River
Daniel Boone Corridor, a proposed light rail route in St. Louis
Daniel Boone National Forest, Kentucky